"Rock Lobster" is a song by The B-52's.

Rock Lobster may also refer to:

 Jasus edwardsii, the southern rock lobster, red rock lobster, or spiny rock lobster
 Other spiny lobsters of the family Palinuridae, known as rock lobsters
 "Rock Lobsters", an episode of Hi Hi Puffy AmiYumi
 Amiga 500, a computer codenamed "Rock Lobster"